is a passenger railway station in the town of Tōnoshō, Chiba Japan, operated by the East Japan Railway Company (JR East).

Lines

Station layout
The station consists of dual opposed side platforms connected by a footbridge to a wooden, single-story station building. The station is unattended.

Platforms

History
Shimōsa-Tachibana Station was opened on March 11, 1933, as a station on the Japanese Government Railway (JGR) for both freight and passenger operations. After World War II, the JGR became the Japan National Railways (JNR). Scheduled freight operations were suspended from October 1, 1962. The station has been unattended since March 1, 1972. The station was absorbed into the JR East network upon the privatization of the Japan National Railways (JNR) on April 1, 1987.

Passenger statistics
In fiscal 2015, the station was used by an average of 408 passengers daily (boarding passengers only).

Surrounding area
 
 Tonegawa Ohashi
 Tonosho Town Health and Welfare Center
 Tachibana Post Office

See also
 List of railway stations in Japan

References

External links

JR East station information 

Railway stations in Japan opened in 1933
Railway stations in Chiba Prefecture
Narita Line
Tōnoshō